Thomas John "Dude" Esterbrook (June 20, 1857 – April 30, 1901) was an American Major League Baseball player from Staten Island, New York who played the majority of his games at third base, but did play many games at first base.

In , Esterbrook was named the manager, or "Captain" as it was known then, of the Louisville Colonels. After only ten games, and only two wins, the team owner determined that due to the team's record and his manager's confrontational behavior, Esterbrook would be fired and replaced by Jimmy Wolf.

Esterbrook died at the age of 43 when he leaped from a train, in Middletown, New York, that was transporting him to a mental hospital. He is buried at Green-Wood Cemetery in Brooklyn, New York.

See also
List of Major League Baseball player–managers

References

External links

1857 births
1901 suicides
Major League Baseball third basemen
Major League Baseball player-managers
19th-century baseball players
Buffalo Bisons (NL) players
Cleveland Blues (NL) players
New York Metropolitans players
New York Giants (NL) players
Indianapolis Hoosiers (NL) players
Louisville Colonels players
Louisville Colonels managers
Brooklyn Grooms players
Sportspeople from Staten Island
Baseball players from New York City
Burials at Green-Wood Cemetery
New York Metropolitans (minor league) players
London Tecumsehs (baseball) players
New Orleans Pelicans (baseball) players
Suicides by jumping in the United States
Suicides in New York (state)
Westfield Athletics players